Arthur Cyrille Albert Malouin (March 13, 1857 – April 5, 1936) was a Canadian lawyer, politician, and Puisne Justice of the Supreme Court of Canada.

Born in Quebec City, Canada East (now Quebec), the son of Jacques Malouin and Marie-Angélique Suzor, he received a Bachelor of Law degree from Université Laval in 1882. He was called to the Quebec Bar in 1882 and practised law in Quebec City.

In an 1898 by-election, he was acclaimed to the House of Commons of Canada as a Liberal for the riding of Quebec-Centre. He was re-elected in 1900 and 1904. In 1905, he was appointed a Puisne Judge of the Quebec Superior Court, Arthabasca District. On January 30, 1924, he was appointed to the Supreme Court but served only until October 1, 1924.

References
 
 Supreme Court of Canada biography

Justices of the Supreme Court of Canada
Liberal Party of Canada MPs
Members of the House of Commons of Canada from Quebec
1857 births
1936 deaths
Université Laval alumni
Université Laval Faculté de droit alumni